The Monthon Nakhon Si Thammarat was an administrative subdivision of Thailand in the early 20th century. It included the eastern part of southern Thailand.

History
The monthon was established in 1896, when the Nakhon Si Thammarat kingdom was abolished and incorporated into Siam. It originally contained the provinces Songkhla, Nakhon Si Thammarat, and Phatthalung. In 1896-1897 the administration was in Songkhla in the present-day Songkhla National Museum.

1925 Monthon Surat was incorporated into Monthon Nakhon Si Thammarat in 1932 as was Monthon Pattani. All monthons were dismantled in 1933.

List of commissioners
1896-1906 Phraya Sukhumnaiwinit (Pan Sukhum)
1906-1910 Phraya Chonlaburanurak (Charoen Charuchinda)
1910-1925 Prince of Lopburi

Nakhon Si Thammarat